Farrukh Yassar II was the brief 42nd shah of Shirvan.

Reign 
Not much is known about his reign; his existence was disputed until a 1934 discovery of a hoard of 906 silver Shirvanshah coins in Salyan. It was known that his son was invited by local nobility to succeed Khalilullah II. He was probably forced to flee to Dagestan, upon rebelling against his brother Khalilullah II. However, another numismatic evidence shows that he somehow managed to mint coins with his name on them.

References 

Year of birth unknown
16th-century people of Safavid Iran